Goofer dust is a traditional hexing material and practice of the African American tradition of hoodoo from the South Eastern region of the United States of America.

Description
It can generally refer to any powder used to cast a spell, especially if harmful in nature, but specifically refers to a concoction of natural ingredients that can be used to cause harm, trouble or even kill an enemy. Some historical sources, such as some of the interviews conducted by Harry M. Hyatt indicate goofer dust can be synonymous with graveyard dirt.

Use
In practice, it was often used to create illness in victims, such as swelling of the legs or blindness. Recipes for making it vary, but primarily include graveyard dirt and snakeskin. Other ingredients may include ash, powdered sulfur, salt, powdered bones, powdered insect chitin, dried manure, herbs, spices and "anvil dust" — the fine black iron detritus found around a blacksmith's anvil. On page 162 of his autobiography  Dr. John / Mac  Rebennack wrote:  "Goofer dust is a combination of dirt from a graveyard, gunpowder, and grease from them (St. Roch Cemetery, New Orleans) bells." The result usually varies in color from "a fine yellowish-grey" to deep "black dust" depending on the formula, and it may be mixed with local dirt to conceal its deployment.

In the modern day, formulations may be thought to include anything harmful that can come to hand. For example, insecticide powders might be mixed with expired medications, dried medical waste, etc. Regardless of any intended magical effects, synergies between the ingredients might cause real medical harm.

It is sometimes used in love spells of a coercive nature, the severity of which range from the goofer dust being used to provoke helpful spirits to coax the target into love, to the more extreme "love me or die" spells. Rarely, it has been used in gambling spells.

Goofer Dust has also been used as a protection spell. By using graveyard dirt from a loved one of the practitioner, along with salt and pepper and other ingredients, the normally offensive functions of Goofer Dust become protective functions.

Etymology
The word Goofer comes from the Kikongo word "Kufwa", which means "To die". Among older Hoodoo practitioners, this derivation is very clear, because "Goofer" is not only used as an adjective modifying "dust" but also a verb ("He goofered that man") and a noun ("She put a goofer on him"). As late as the 1930s, goofering was a regional synonym for hoodooing, and in North Carolina at least, the meaning of the term was broadened beyond spells of damage, illness, and death to include love spells cast with dominating intent.

A euphemistic word for goofering is "poisoning," which in this context does not refer to a physical poison but to a physical agent that, through magical means, brings about an "unnatural illness" or the death of the victim. Even more euphemistic is the special use of the verb "hurt," which is often defined as "to poison," with the tacit understanding that "to poison" really means "to goofer." The more general verbs "fix" (meaning to prepare a spell) and "trick" (meaning to cast a spell) are also applied to goofering.

In popular culture
In the 1954 Cold War classic Night People (film), Col. Steve Van Dyke (Gregory Peck) spiked a bottle of absinthe with a packet of goofer dust.

The X-Files, in Episode 14 of season 7 (Theef), referenced the use of goofer dust by the vengeful father of a woman who died due to poor hospital care.

Goofer dust was referenced to protect against hellhounds in the television show Supernatural (U.S. TV series), Season 2, episode 8 "Crossroad Blues" and in Season 8, episode 14 "Trial and Error".

In the song "Sarah's Night" on the Voodoo album, King Diamond sings that the character Salem uses graveyard dust (referred to as goofer dust) to send the spirits of dead people into Sarah's head.

Goofer dust is referenced in the more popular series of short films "Scary or Die" in which a grandfather with a family history of dabbling in voodoo and the occult blows "Golfer dust" or as she describes to the watcher, "The ash of her loved ones; in which she says that the grandfather told her that if she felt love in her heart it would "Never die" and therefore hexes her to come back as the undead".

Goofer dust is mentioned in the Willie Mabon blues song "I Don't Know". It was also used in the song "I Got My Mojo Workin".

In "Treemonisha" by Scott Joplin, Zodzetrick refers to himself as the goofer dus' man and 'King of Goofer Dus' Land'.

Lil Johnson recorded a song called "Goofer Dust Swing" in 1937.

Michael Ondaatje refers to goofer dust on page three of Coming Through Slaughter.

Colson Whitehead's 2016 novel The Underground Railroad speaks of a slaveowner hiring a witch to "goofer his property" to prevent anyone from escaping.

In FXX's 2022 original series Little Demon, Laura and Darlene get trapped in a hidden pocket realm Laura uses as a junkyard on their Girls' Night. In the pocket, there are goofer dust gusts (in the form of a dust devil) that Laura tries to infiltrate in order to obtain 5 mg of goofer dust for a bomb. The girls use the goofer dust bomb to blow a hole through the pocket realm back to their plane of Earth.

References

 

Hoodoo (spirituality)
Magic powders